Rubus parvifolius, called Japanese bramble, or Australian raspberry  in the United States or native raspberry in Australia is a species of plant in the rose family. It is a scrambling shrub native to eastern Asia (China, Japan, Korea, Vietnam) and Australia. It has also become naturalized in a few scattered locations in the United States.

Rubus parvifolius is a shrub up to 2 meters tall with arching branches armed with curved prickles. Young stems are finely pubescent, becoming hairless with age. The leaves are pinnate with 3 to 5 toothed leaflets. Flowers are numerous, in clumps at the end of stems, and have red or pink petals. The red fruit is 1 cm wide.

Uses
The red fruit is pleasantly flavored and can be eaten raw or used in sauces and jams. The dried fruit are used in traditional Chinese medicine.

References

External links
 
 Photo of herbarium specimen at Missouri Botanical Garden, collected in Missouri in 1989
 

parvifolius
Bushfood
Flora of China
Flora of Eastern Asia
Flora of Vietnam
Flora of Australia
Plants described in 1753
Taxa named by Carl Linnaeus